The 2021–22 season was the Manitoba Junior Hockey League's (MJHL) 105th season of operation.

Season Highlights
The MJHL returns to a two-division format.
The Neepawa Natives change their team name to the Titans.
This is the first full season of play for the Winnipeg Freeze after the abbreviated 2020–21 season.  The Freeze relocate to the Jonathon Toews Sportsplex in St. Vital, Winnipeg prior to the season.
The MJHL Showcase is played from November 22 to 24, 2021 at Stride Place in Portage la Prairie.
The Dauphin Kings defeat the Steinbach Pistons 4-games-to-3 to win the Turnbull Cup.
2022 Centennial Cup
Hockey Canada and the Canadian Junior Hockey League cancel all regional playoffs, including the ANAVET Cup, in favour of having all league champions advance directly to the national tournament.
The Dauphin Kings advance to the semi-final of the Centennial Cup, losing 2-0 to the Pickering Panthers. Carson Cherepak of the Kings, the Most Valuable Player (MVP) of the MJHL playoffs, is also named Centennial Cup MVP.

Standings

Playoffs

Brackets

Quarter-final round results
Series A - (E1) Steinbach Pistons vs (E4) Selkirk Steelers

Series B - (E2) Winkler Flyers vs (E3) Winnipeg Blues

Series C - (W1) Dauphin Kings vs (W4) Swan Valley Stampeders

Series D - (W2) Waywayseecappo Wolverines vs (W3) Virden Oil Capitals

Semi-final round results
Series E - (E1) Steinbach Pistons vs (W3) Virden Oil Capitals

Series F - (W1) Dauphin Kings vs. (E2) Winkler Flyers

Final round results
Series G - (E1) Steinbach Pistons vs. (W1) Dauphin Kings

League awards 
 Steve "Boomer" Hawrysh Award (MVP): Braden Fischer, Virden Oil Capitals
 Ed Belfour Top Goaltender Trophy: Carson Cherepak, Dauphin Kings
 Brian Kozak Award (Top Defenceman): Parker Malchuk, Dauphin Kings
 Vince Leah Trophy (Rookie of the Year): Carson Buydens, Virden Oil Capitals
 Frank McKinnon Memorial Trophy (Hockey Ability and Sportsmanship): Brayden Foreman, Winnipeg Blues
 Muzz McPherson Award (Coach of the Year): Doug Hedley, Dauphin Kings
 Mike Ridley Trophy (Scoring Champion): Justin Svenson, Winkler Flyers
 MJHL Playoff MVP: Carson Cherepak, Dauphin Kings

References

External links

 MJHL Website
 2021-22 MJHL season at HockeyDB.com

Manitoba Junior Hockey League seasons
MJHL